Elections to Epping Forest Council were held on 4 May 2006.  One third of the council was up for election and the council stayed under no overall control.

The Labour Party was reduced to one seat following wipeout of their representation in Loughton - remaining Labour councillor, Peter Gode of Shelley would resign in 2015. Stephen Murray, Labour councillor for Loughton Roding, defected and became an Independent. This election also marks the most recent time a Conservative has won a seat in Loughton.

The Liberal Democrats lost another seat, whilst the Loughton Residents Association also lost a seat to the British National Party, who doubled their representation and increased their vote share. Three Independents remained on the council, and Chigwell Residents Association councillor, John Knapman (who groups with the Loughton Residents Association) continued to serve out their terms. 

This would be the last election in which the Conservatives would not have control of the council. This would change following a by-election in Grange Hill in December 2006 which would see the Conservatives cross the majority threshold and assume control of the chamber.

By-elections

Lower Sheering by-election

Chigwell Village by-election
N.B: The Conservative figure is marked as N/A because the last election this ward was contested in did not feature a Conservative candidate, rather a Chigwell Residents Association candidate

Results

Buckhurst Hill East

Buckhurst Hill West

Chigwell Village

Chipping Ongar, Greensted and Marden Ash

Epping Hemnall

Epping Lindsey and Thornwood Common

Grange Hill

Loughton Alderton

Loughton Broadway

Loughton Fairmead

Loughton Forest

Loughton Roding

Loughton St. John's

Loughton St. Mary's

Lower Nazeing

North Weald Bassett

Theydon Bois

Waltham Abbey Honey Lane

Waltham Abbey Paternoster
Councillor Reginald Chidley, elected as a Conservative in 2002, resigned from the Conservative group and sat as an Independent. He was defeated in this election by a Conservative opponent.

References

2006 Epping Forest election result
Ward results

2006
2006 English local elections
2000s in Essex